The T. S. Eliot bibliography contains a list of works by T. S. Eliot.

Poetry
The following is a list of books of poetry by T. S. Eliot arranged chronologically by first edition. Some of Eliot's poems were first published in booklet or pamphlet format (such as his Ariel poems.)

Plays
The following is a list of plays by T. S. Eliot arranged chronologically by first edition.

Fiction
 "Eeldrop and Appleplex", I. Little Review, Chicago, IL, IV. 1 (May 1917) pp. 7–11 
 "Eeldrop and Appleplex", II. Little Review, Chicago, IL, IV. 5 (Sept 1917) pp. 16–19 
 "Eeldrop and Appleplex", both parts, The Foundling Press, Tunbridge Wells (1992) limited edition of 500 copies

Non-fiction
The following is a list of non-fiction books by T. S. Eliot arranged chronologically by first edition.

Letters
The following is a list of books of letters by T. S. Eliot arranged chronologically by first edition.

Works on T. S. Eliot
The following is a list of works about T. S. Eliot and his works.

References
Notes

Citations

Bibliography

External links
 
 Poems by T. S. Eliot and biography at PoetryFoundation.org
 Early Poems by T. S. Eliot (1907-1910)
 T. S. Eliot Collection at Bartleby.com
 T. S. Eliot Hypertext Project
 What the Thunder Said: T. S. Eliot
 T. S. Eliot at Faber and Faber
 T. S. Eliot Society Home Page

Bibliographies by writer
Bibliographies of British writers
Bibliographies of American writers
Christian bibliographies